Merton may refer to:

People 
 Merton (surname)
 Merton (given name)
 Merton (YouTube), American YouTube personality

Fictional characters 
 Merton Matowski, an alternate name for "Moose" Mason, an Archie Comics character
 Lord Merton, in the British television series Downton Abbey
 The title character of The Mrs Merton Show, a British television series

Places

Australia 
 Merton (New South Wales), a farm located near Denman, in the Hunter Region
 Merton, Victoria, a town
 Merton railway station
 Merton, Tasmania, part of Glenorchy

England 
 London Borough of Merton
 Merton, London (parish)
 Merton, Devon, a village, ecclesiastical parish, former manor and civil parish
 Merton, Norfolk, a civil parish
 Merton, Oxfordshire, a village and civil parish

New Zealand 
 Merton, New Zealand, a farming community

United States 
 Merton Township, Steele County, Minnesota
 Merton, Minnesota, an unincorporated community 
 Merton Township, South Dakota
 Merton, Wisconsin, a town
 Merton (village), Wisconsin, a village partially within the town

Other uses 
 Merton College, Oxford, one of the colleges of the University of Oxford
 Merton Field, a grass playing field south of Merton College
 Merton Street, Oxford
 Merton College, London, formerly a further education college, as of 2009 the Merton campus of South Thames College
 Battle of Meretun or Morton, fought in 871 between the Saxon army of Wessex and the Danish Great Heathen Army 
 The Merton, a high-rise development located in Kennedy Town, Hong Kong
 Viscount Merton, a UK title

See also 
 Statute of Merton, considered the first English statute, passed in 1235
 Merton Professors, two professorships in English in the University of Oxford
 Merton Park, London
 Merton Priory or Abbey, London
 Murton (disambiguation)